The South Carolina Air–Line Railway was a railroad company formed in March 1877 and merged a month later with the Georgia Air Line Railway and the North Carolina Air Line Railway to form the Atlanta and Charlotte Air Line Railway.

References

Defunct South Carolina railroads
Railway companies disestablished in 1877
Railway companies established in 1877
1877 establishments in South Carolina